Douglas Bridge is a small village near Strabane in County Tyrone, Northern Ireland. In the 2011 Census it had a population of 124. It lies within the Derry City and Strabane area.

The name comes  and the English bridge. The settlement straddles the boundaries of the townlands of Drumnahoe, Skinboy, and Knockroe. The modern Irish name is Droichead na Dúghlaise.

People 

The poem "Ballad of Douglas Bridge" by Francis Carlin appears in Anthology of Irish Verse, 1922, by Padraic Colum.

References 

Villages in County Tyrone